A district of the Punjab state of India is an administrative geographical unit, headed by a District Magistrate or Deputy Commissioner, an officer belonging to the Indian Administrative Service. The District Magistrate or the Deputy Commissioner is assisted by a number of officers belonging to Punjab Civil Service and other state services. There are 23 Districts in Punjab, after Malerkotla district bifurcated from Sangrur district as the 23rd district on 14 May 2021

Overview
Senior Superintendent of Police, an officer belonging to the Indian Police Service is entrusted with the responsibility of maintaining law and order and related issues in the districts of the state. He is assisted by the officers of the Punjab Police and other services.

Division Forest Officer, an officer belonging to the Indian Forest Service is responsible for managing the forests, environment and wildlife related issues of the districts. He is assisted by the officers of the Department of Forest and Wildlife.

Sectoral development is looked after by the district head of each development sector such as Irrigation, PwD (Public works department), Agriculture, Health, Education,  Animal husbandry, etc. These offices belong to various state services.

List

References

 
District
Punjab, India